The Tri-County Regional School Board (TCRSB) is the public school board responsible for 23 elementary, junior high, and high schools in Digby County, Yarmouth County, and Shelburne County in Nova Scotia, Canada.

The Tri-County Regional School Board was established on August 1, 2004, when the province formed two separate Boards out of the former Southwest Regional School Board.

Schools

Digby County

All grades
Islands Consolidated School (pr to 12); Freeport

Elementary schools
Barton Consolidated School (pr to 6); Barton
Digby Elementary School (pr to 6); Digby
Weymouth Consolidated School (pr to 6); Weymouth
Digby Neck Consolidated School (pr to 6); Digby Neck

High schools
Digby Regional High School (7 to 12); Digby
St Mary's Bay Academy (7 to 12); Weymouth

Yarmouth County

All grades
Drumlin Heights Consolidated School (pr to 12); Glenwood

Elementary schools
Carleton Consolidated School (pr to 6); Carleton
Meadowfields Community School (pr to 6); Yarmouth
Plymouth School (pr to 6); Plymouth
Port Maitland Consolidated Elementary School (pr to 6); Port Maitland
Yarmouth Central Elementary School (pr to 6); Yarmouth

Junior high/middle schools
Maple Grove Education Centre (7 to 8); Hebron

High schools
Yarmouth Consolidated Memorial High School (9 to 12); Yarmouth

Shelburne County

Elementary schools
Clark's Harbour Elementary School (pr to 6); Clark's Harbour
Evelyn Richardson Elementary School (pr to 6); Shag Harbour
Forest Ridge Academy (pr to 6); Barrington
Hillcrest Academy (pr to 6); Shelburne
Lockeport Elementary School (pr to 6); Lockeport

High schools
Barrington Municipal High School (7 to 12); Barrington
Lockeport Regional High School (7 to 12); Lockeport
Shelburne Regional High School (7 to 12); Shelburne

See also
List of Nova Scotia schools
Education in Canada

References

External links
Tri-County Regional School Board

School districts in Nova Scotia
Education in Digby County, Nova Scotia
Education in Yarmouth County
Education in Shelburne County, Nova Scotia
Yarmouth, Nova Scotia